Neu Zauche is a municipality in the district of Dahme-Spreewald in Brandenburg in Germany.

Demography

People 
 Kaspar Ludwig von Bredow (1685-1773), Prussian general

References

Localities in Dahme-Spreewald